Alimestan (known as Alimastan also Romanized as Alīmestān; also known as ‘Alamestān and Alamestān) is a village in Chelav Rural District, in the Central District of Amol County, Mazandaran Province, Iran. At the 2006 census, its population was 9, in 5 families.
The Alimastan jungle is nicknamed 'Iran Green Gold'. Alimestan village is known for its scenery, which attracts Iranian and international nature photographers. Located along the Haraz Road, the green forest of this village has two 10-meter deep meteorite impact craters. Local legend suggests that the craters were formed when Shahnameh (Book of Kings) hero Rostam kneeled to drink from a nearby spring.

References 

Populated places in Amol County
Tourist attractions in Amol